Spartree is a Canadian short documentary film, directed by Phillip Borsos and released in 1977. A process documentary about loggers preparing a spar tree for use in a cable logging operation, it won the Canadian Film Award for Best Theatrical Short Film at the 27th Canadian Film Awards.

To achieve the film's climactic shot, Borsos assembled 12 different cameras around the forest floor.

In addition to its Canadian Film Award win for Best Theatrical Short Film, it won the awards for Best Cinematography in a Non-Feature and Best Sound in a Non-Feature.

The film was also later the subject of Spartree: Making the Film, a documentary about its creation.

References

External links

1977 films
English-language Canadian films
National Film Board of Canada documentaries
Films directed by Phillip Borsos
Canadian short documentary films
1970s short documentary films
National Film Board of Canada short films
Best Theatrical Short Film Genie and Canadian Screen Award winners
1970s English-language films
1970s Canadian films